Anna Peters (28 February 1843, Mannheim – 26 June 1926, Stuttgart) was a German painter remembered for her flower paintings and landscapes. She was the daughter and pupil of the Dutch landscape painter Pieter Francis Peters.

Biography

Peters was born in Mannheim on 28 February 1843, the daughter of the Dutch landscape painter Pieter Francis Peters (1818-1903) and his wife Heinrike Gertrude Mali (died 1884). Her grandfather had worked as a glass painter in Nijmegen. Her mother was a sister of Christian Mali, a wildlife painter of the Munich school. In 1845, the family moved to Stuttgart, where Peters lived with her sisters, Pietronella Peters (1848-1924) and Ida Peters. Pietronella achieved success as a genre-painter. Anna remained unmarried.

Peters was the first woman in Germany who was able to make a living from the sale of her paintings. During the summer months she regularly visited Schloss Köngen to the southeast of Stuttgart, where she and her sisters had a studio where they were able to develop their artistic skills. Her works include drawings, watercolours and oil paintings—her first known picture dates to 1860. Peters began to produce flower paintings and village landscapes. In Schloss Köngen, she met Christian Mali and his artist friend Anton Braith. The focus of her work continued to be mainly paintings of flowers and plants in the traditional Dutch century style. They frequently consisted on bouquets with grasses and twigs, occasionally with insects. She produced several landscapes, a few pictures of children, and added decorations to royal castles at Stuttgart and Friedrichshafen. She won medals for her work in 1873, 1874, 1876, and 1877. In the late 1890s, her style became increasingly impressionistic. She regularly took part in exhibitions after 1896 in Berlin, Munich, Dresden and Vienna. In 1900 she produced a painting of Schloss Köngen itself.  

Peters was a member of the state political association of female Berlin artists (Berliner Künstlerinnen) from 1880. She also organized exhibitions and hosted social events, seeking to overcome some of the reservations about women painters of the times, campaigning for their social recognition.

Peters's final years from 1912 were spent with her sisters in her home in Stuttgart-Sonnenberg, where she died on June 26, 1926. The Anna-Peters Road in Stuttgart is named after her.

References

Bibliography

External links

1843 births
1926 deaths
19th-century German painters
20th-century German painters
German women painters
19th-century German women artists
20th-century German women artists
Artists from Mannheim
German landscape painters